Héctor Isidro Velázquez García (born April 30, 1989) is a former Mexican professional footballer who spent his entire career with Dorados de Sinaloa.

After arriving at the club in 2007, Velázquez initially played with the Dorados reserve teams in the Segunda División and Tercera División. He made his professional debut with the first team on 8 January 2010, coming on as a substitute during the final minutes of a Liga de Ascenso fixture against Guerreros de Hermosillo.

Honours

Club
Dorados de Sinaloa
 Ascenso MX (2): Clausura 2015, Apertura 2016
 Copa MX (1): Apertura 2012

References

External links
 
 

Living people
1989 births
Mexican footballers
Association football midfielders
Dorados de Sinaloa footballers
Liga MX players
Ascenso MX players
Liga Premier de México players
Tercera División de México players
Footballers from Sinaloa